Charles Hope Petty-Fitzmaurice, 7th Marquess of Lansdowne (9 January 1917 – 30 August 1944) was a British nobleman and peer. He was the son of Henry Petty-FitzMaurice, 6th Marquess of Lansdowne.

He died aged 27, in Italy, killed in action during the Second World War. Captain Charles Hope Fitzmaurice Lansdowne served with the Royal Wiltshire Yeomanry, Royal Armoured Corps and died on 20 August 1944.  Lord Lansdowne was unmarried and childless, and his titles passed to his cousin, George Petty-Fitzmaurice, as his younger brother had also been killed in action in Normandy nine days earlier.

The Scottish title Lord Nairne, however, passed to his elder sister Katherine Evelyn Constance Petty-Fitzmaurice (1912–1995), who became the 12th Baroness Nairne. She also inherited Derreen House and Gardens (Lauragh, County Kerry, Republic of Ireland) from her brother.

References

External links

1917 births
1944 deaths
Charles
Royal Wiltshire Yeomanry officers
7
British Army personnel killed in World War II
Earls of Kerry